Standings and results for Group 8 of the UEFA Euro 2000 qualifying tournament.

Standings

Matches

Goalscorers

Notes

References

External links
UEFA web site

Group 8
qual
qual
1998–99 in Croatian football
1999–2000 in Croatian football
1998–99 in Yugoslav football
1999–2000 in Yugoslav football
FR Yugoslavia at UEFA Euro 2000
1999–2000 in Republic of Macedonia football
1998–99 in Republic of Macedonia football
1999–2000 in Maltese football
1998–99 in Maltese football